”The Shepherd’s Song” is a song written by the English composer Edward Elgar in 1892. The words are by Barry Pain.

History
The manuscript is dated 22 August 1892.

The song was first published in 1895 by Tuckwood as his Op. 16 No.1, then in 1896 by Ascherberg.  It was re-published in 1907 by Ascherberg, Hopwood & Crew, as the last of the Seven Lieder of Edward Elgar (with English and German words).

The song may be the same as that called Muleteer's Song for which permission was obtained from Barry Pain to use the words on 3 March 1894.

Lyrics

German words by Ed. Sachs.

Recordings

Songs and Piano Music by Edward Elgar has "The Shepherd's Song"  performed by Mark Wilde (tenor), with David Owen Norris (piano).
The Songs of Edward Elgar SOMM CD 220 Catherine Wyn-Rogers (soprano) with Malcolm Martineau (piano), at Southlands College, London, April 1999
free-scores.com

Notes

References

Banfield, Stephen, Sensibility and English Song: Critical studies of the early 20th century (Cambridge University Press, 1985) 
Kennedy, Michael, Portrait of Elgar (Oxford University Press, 1968) 
Moore, Jerrold N. “Edward Elgar: a creative life” (Oxford University Press, 1984)

External links

Songs about shepherds
Songs by Edward Elgar
1892 songs